The women's kumite +61 kg competition in Karate at the 2020 Summer Olympics was held on 7 August 2021 at the Nippon Budokan.

Competition format
The competition began with a two-pool round-robin stage followed by a single elimination stage. Each pool consisted of five athletes, with those positioned 1st and 4th seeded to Pool A, and those positioned 2nd and 3rd to Pool B. The athlete that finished first in Pool A faced the athlete that finished second in Pool B in the semifinals, and vice versa. There were no bronze medal matches in the kumite events. Losers of the semifinals each received a bronze medal.

Schedule 
All times are in local time (UTC+9).

Results

Pool stage
Pool A

Pool B

Finals

References

External links
Seeding and competition format
 Complete Results book of Karate Event in Tokyo 2020 Olympic Games 

Karate at the 2020 Summer Olympics
Women's events at the 2020 Summer Olympics
2021 in women's karate